Folkert Evert Posthuma (20 May 1874, Leeuwarden – 3 June 1943, Vorden) was a Dutch politician.

During the first World War he was the Minister of Agriculture, Industry and Trade in the government of Cort van der Linden and as such responsible for the food distribution. Before and after his ministership he held a senior management position at the insurance company Centraal Beheer. In the 1930s he became a sympathiser, but not a member, of the NSB. In 1943 he was asked by NSB leader Anton Mussert to become his representative for agriculture but was assassinated later that year by the Dutch resistance.

See also
List of Dutch politicians

References

1874 births
1943 deaths
Ministers of Economic Affairs of the Netherlands
Ministers of Agriculture of the Netherlands
Dutch agronomists
National Socialist Movement in the Netherlands politicians
People from Leeuwarden
Wageningen University and Research alumni
Dutch collaborators with Nazi Germany
Assassinated Dutch politicians
People murdered in the Netherlands